William J. "Will" Dobson is an American journalist and author who writes frequently on foreign affairs and international politics. He is currently the Politics and Foreign Affairs Editor for Slate.

Early life

Dobson was born on a naval base in North Kingston, Rhode Island. His father, W. Joel Dobson, was a Lt. Commander in the U.S. Navy. His mother, Barbara Joyce Dobson, is an English teacher.

Dobson grew up in Spartanburg, South Carolina, and attended Spartanburg Day School. He received a Bachelor of Arts summa cum laude from Middlebury College. He later earned a master's degree in East Asian Studies from Harvard University and a Juris Doctor cum laude from Harvard Law School. He lives in Washington, DC with his wife and two children.

Career
From 2004 to 2008, Dobson was the Managing Editor of Foreign Policy magazine. During his tenure at Foreign Policy, the magazine was nominated for a National Magazine Award five years in a row – the only magazine of its size to receive five consecutive nominations – and won the top prize twice.

Previously, he served as the Senior Editor for Asia at Newsweek International and as Associate Editor at Foreign Affairs. He has also been a visiting scholar at the Carnegie Endowment for International Peace.

During the height of the Arab Spring, he wrote daily pieces on modern authoritarianism for the Washington Post’s editorial page. While reporting from Cairo, Dobson wrote the first account of the Egyptian military’s torture of female protestors in Tahrir Square.

Dobson's first book, The Dictator's Learning Curve was published by Doubleday in 2012. The non-fiction book is an analysis of modern authoritarianism and has been reviewed by various media.

Awards

Dobson was named a Young Global Leader by the World Economic Forum in 2006. In 2003, he was named the U.S. Rapporteur for the World Economic Forum's East Asia Summit. The Singapore International Foundation awarded him a Distinguished Visitor Fellowship in 2008. The East-West Center awarded him a Senior Journalist Fellowship for Southeast Asia (2006) and an Journalism Fellowship (2008). Dobson was a Knight Media Fellow (2003) to the Salzburg Global Seminar, and later a Freeman Fellow in U.S.-East Asian Relations (2007).

Middlebury College recognized him with an Alumni Achievement Award in 2011.  Dobson is also a 1994 Truman Scholar.

Published works
 The Dictator’s Learning Curve, (Doubleday; 2012). ]

Articles
 The East Is Crimson, Slate, May 23, 2012
 Why China Wishes Chen Would Just Go Away, Slate, May 2, 2012
 Dictatorship for Dummies, Tunisia Edition, The Washington Post, January 23, 2011
 'The Military is above the Nation', The Washington Post, March 15, 2011
 ‘Another dictatorship, just with new faces’ for Egypt, The Washington Post, March 16, 2011
 ‘Worse than our Worst Nightmare during Mubarak,' The Washington Post, March 17, 2011
 Where are the dictator’s helpers? The Washington Post, March 18, 2011
 One Woman’s Fight to Preserve a Russian Forest, The Washington Post, March 24, 2011
 The Opposition Dictators Deserve, The Washington Post, April 16, 2011
 Why I am Glad bin Laden Lived to See the Arab Spring, The Washington Post, May 5, 2011
 In Venezuela, Fighting for the Chance to Run: ‘He will annihilate that one leader,’ The Washington Post, May 15, 2011
 Imagining a World Without Dictators, The Washington Post, August 26, 2011
 Why Gaddafi was the quintessential 20th-century dictator, The Washington Post, October 21, 2011
 In Russia, Fires—and politicians—are bringing down forests, The Washington Post, August 13, 2010
 China’s Jittery Leaders, The New Republic, March 3, 2011
 A Victory for Democratic Foreign Policy, The New Republic, May 3, 2011
 The Day Nothing Much Changed, Foreign Policy. August 8, 2006
 Tunisia’s Lessons for Repressive Regimes, U.S. News & World Report. January 20, 2011
 Global Democracy over a Barrel, The Boston Globe, May 14, 2009

Media appearances
Dobson has provided commentary for various news organizations, including CNN, CBS, MSNBC, PBS NewsHour, National Public Radio, and Voice of America.

References

External links
 

American male journalists
Middlebury College alumni
American foreign policy writers
American male non-fiction writers
American magazine editors
International relations scholars
Living people
1973 births
Harvard Law School alumni